Piru is a small town and capital of the West Seram Regency on the southwestern coast of the Indonesian island of Seram. At the 2020 Census, it had 16,336 inhabitants. On 21–22 August 1999 there was violent conflict in the area and other settlements such as Ariate, Loki, Laala and Wailissa, which resulted in 12 deaths in total on the island.

Climate
Piru has a tropical rainforest climate (Af) with moderate rainfall in July and August and heavy rainfall in the remaining months.

References

Populated places in Seram Island
West Seram Regency
Regency seats of Maluku (province)